The West Indies campaign of 1803–1810 was a series of military contests mainly in the Caribbean spanning the Napoleonic Wars involving European powers Napoleonic France, the Batavian Republic, Spain, the Kingdom of Portugal and the United Kingdom of Great Britain and Ireland. Eventually British naval forces dominated the seas and by 1810 every French, Dutch and Danish colony was firmly under allied (mainly British) control.

Background 
France by 1804 had lost Haiti and its American colony of Louisiana after it sold Louisiana to United States. France still retained its large colony of Santo Domingo which it had acquired from Spain at the Treaty of Basel. Martinique and Guadeloupe were large sugar producing islands and also Cayenne in northern South America. The Dutch, being allied to the French, also had islands in the West Indies and territories in South America.

Campaigns

The Trafalgar campaign

Atlantic campaign of 1806

Reconquista (Santo Domingo)

By this time Spain a former enemy of the British and ally of the French was now invaded by French forces which led to the Peninsula war. Once the news of the invasion had reached the island, the criollos of Santo Domingo revolted against French rule and were later assisted by the Royal Navy of the United Kingdom who were now Spain's new ally.

Invasion of the Danish West Indies 1807

Invasion of Cayenne 1809
By 1808 French colonial territories in the Caribbean were a drain on both the French and British navies. The fortified harbours on the islands and coastal towns provided shelter for French warships and privateers that could strike against British trade routes at will, forcing the Royal Navy to divert extensive resources to protect their convoys. However, the maintenance and support of these bases was a significant task for the French Navy. It had suffered a series of defeats during the war that left it blockaded in its own harbours and unable to put to sea without attack from British squadrons waiting off the coast. Cut off from French trade and supplies, the Caribbean colonies began to suffer from food shortages and collapsing economies, and messages were sent to France in the summer of 1808 requesting urgent help.

Some of these messages were intercepted by the patrolling Royal Navy.  Based on the description in those messages of the low morale and weak defences of the Caribbean territories, the decision was taken to eliminate the threat from the French colonies for the remainder of the war by seizing and occupying them in a series of amphibious operations. Command of this campaign was given to Rear-Admiral Sir Alexander Cochrane, who focused his initial efforts on Martinique, gathering a substantial force of ships and men at Barbados in preparation for the planned invasion. While the main British forces concentrated in the Leeward Islands, smaller expeditionary forces were sent to watch other French colonies.

French expeditions of resupply (1809)

Invasion of Martinique

Invasion of Guadeloupe

Aftermath
The fall of Guadeloupe marked the end of the final French territory in the Caribbean; the entire region was now in the hands of either the British or the Spanish, except the independent state of Haiti. The lack of French privateers and warships sparked a boom in trade operations, and the economies of the Caribbean islands experienced a resurgence. It also made a significant reduction in French international trade and had a corresponding effect on the French economy. Finally, the capture of the last French colony struck a decisive blow to the Atlantic slave trade, which had been made illegal by the British government in 1807 and was actively persecuted by the Royal Navy. Without French colonies in the Caribbean, there was no ready market for slaves in the region and the slave trade consequently dried up.

Notes

References 
 
 
 
 

History of the Caribbean
Conflicts in 1804
Conflicts in 1805
Conflicts in 1806
Conflicts in 1807
Conflicts in 1808
Conflicts in 1809
Conflicts in 1810
Campaigns of the Napoleonic Wars
Naval battles involving the United Kingdom
Naval battles involving France
Battles involving France
Battles involving Spain
Battles involving Portugal
Battles involving the United Kingdom
Battles of the Napoleonic Wars
19th-century history of the Royal Navy
History of the French Navy
Spanish West Indies
1804 in the Caribbean
1805 in the Caribbean
1806 in the Caribbean
1807 in the Caribbean
1808 in the Caribbean
1809 in the Caribbean
1810 in the Caribbean